Braddock Point Light was a lighthouse just west of Braddock Bay at Bogus Point on Lake Ontario in New York.

History
The lighthouse was established and lit in 1896 and was deactivated in 1954. The lighthouse was constructed out of red brick, with an octagonal tower. The lantern portion of the tower was removed from an 1870s lighthouse in Cleveland, Ohio and moved to Braddock in 1895. The original lens, installed in 1896, was a third-and-half-order Fresnel lens. The upper two-thirds of the tower was removed by the Coast Guard in 1954 due to structural damage.

The Coast Guard reactivated the light on February 28, 1999. The lighthouse is now privately owned and has opened as a bed and breakfast. The lighthouse was put up for sale in November 2014 by owners Donald and Nandy Town.

References

Further reading
 Oleszewski, Wes. Great Lakes Lighthouses, American and Canadian: A Comprehensive Directory/Guide to Great Lakes Lighthouses, (Gwinn, Michigan: Avery Color Studios, Inc., 1998) .
 
 U.S. Coast Guard. Historically Famous Lighthouses (Washington, D.C.: Government Printing Office, 1957).
 Wright, Larry and Wright, Patricia. Great Lakes Lighthouses Encyclopedia Hardback (Erin: Boston Mills Press, 2006)

External links

Seaway Trail Lighthouses
Braddock Point Lighthouse - United States Lighthouses

Lighthouses completed in 1896
Lighthouses in New York (state)
Transportation buildings and structures in Monroe County, New York
Lighthouses of the Great Lakes